Salt River High School is a high school on the Salt River Pima-Maricopa Indian Community near Scottsdale, Arizona. It is operated by that tribe's Education Department along with an early education/Head Start facility, elementary school, alternative school and higher education department. The high school opened in August 2004 with an award-winning campus and grounds. Salt River High School is located on a federally recognized Native American reservation, which provides students and families opportunities to learn and partake in the rich histories and contemporary experiences of both the O'Odham (Pima) and Piipaash (Maricopa) people who reside within and/or are members of the Salt River Pima-Maricopa Indian Community. Salt River High School is a member of the Canyon Athletic Association.

Native Studies
Students learn the history and values of the Community, which are integrated into classroom. Students are exposed to the culture of the O'Odham and Piipaash people. Salt River High School students are also encouraged to share and participate in their culture in multiple ways both in and out of school.

Student Programs & Electives
Programs: Junior A.C.E, Salt River Police Explorer and S.T.E.P. Up Tutoring Program | 
Student Electives: Native Studies, Computer & Technology, ELA Enrichment Class (Grades 7 & 8), Health & Fitness, J.R.O.T.C., Journalism / Yearbook, Music, Peer Mediation, Robotics, Service Learning, Spanish, Student Council, Success 101, Theatre and Visual Art.

References

Gallery

External links
 

Public high schools in Arizona
Schools in Maricopa County, Arizona
Charter schools in Arizona
Public middle schools in Arizona